De oppresso liber is the motto of the United States Army Special Forces.

Meaning

United States Army Special Forces tradition 
In the United States Army Special Forces, the motto is traditionally believed to mean "to free from oppression" or "to liberate the oppressed" in Latin.

Actual translation 
A correct translation of the Latin phrase de oppresso liber would be "from (being) an oppressed man, (to being) a free one".

Grammatical structure 
The preposition de here means "from" in the sense of a change from one status to another, not intending separation from the oppressed, but moving from a source in the oppressed. Compare Ovid Fasti 5, 616: inque deum de bove versus erat, "he had been changed from an ox into a god", or Juvenal 7, 197: fies de rhetore consul, "from an orator you will become a consul". Oppresso is the past participle of opprimere ("to oppress") in the ablative case as governed by de, meaning "an oppressed person". The adjective Liber is in the nominative case, "a free person".

Similar phrases 
The motto resembles a quote from St. Augustine: corripiendi sunt inquieti, [...] oppressi liberandi, "the turbulent have to be corrected, [...] the oppressed to be liberated". See also Isaiah 1:17: subvenite oppresso, "relieve the oppressed".

Lineage
The phrase stems from the exploits of World War II Office of Strategic Services Jedburgh/Sussex Teams operating behind the lines in France. Colonel Aaron Bank, father of United States Army Special Forces, and his teams enabled the French Resistance to grow and oppose the occupying German Army. The unconventional warfare tactics of Colonel Bank differed from the conventional warfare tactics of the rest of the United States Army in that they included clandestine support for one side of an existing conflict and that they were subversive to the Nazi forces in power.

Sculpture
The sculpture America's Response Monument is subtitled De Oppresso Liber. It is a life-and-a-half scale bronze statue located in the West Street lobby of One World Financial Center opposite Ground Zero in New York City. Unofficially known as the Horse Soldier Statue,  it is the first public monument dedicated to the United States Special Forces and commemorates the servicemen and women of America’s Special Operations response to 9/11, including those who fought in the early days of Operation Enduring Freedom, which led to the initial defeat of the Taliban in Afghanistan. It was conceived by a private citizen, sculptor Douwe Blumberg, and  commissioned by an anonymous group of Wall Street bankers who lost friends in the 9/11 attacks.

The statue was dedicated on November 11, 2011 in a ceremony led by Vice President Joe Biden and Lt. Gen. John Mulholland, commander of Special Operations Command.

Legacy
The distinct unit insignia inspired that of the 65th Airborne Special Forces Brigade of Iran, the establishment of which was assisted by advisors from the John F. Kennedy Special Warfare Center and School before the 1979 Iranian Revolution.

References

External links
De Oppresso Liber by Kentucky Senator Mitch Mcconnell (Archived)

Latin mottos
Special Operations Forces of the United States